The 2015 Cork Premier Intermediate Hurling Championship was the 12th staging of the Cork Premier Intermediate Hurling Championship since its establishment by the Cork County Board in 2004. The draw for the opening round of the championship took place at the County Convention on 14 December 2014. The championship began on 16 May 2015 and ended on 11 October 2015.

On 11 October 2015, Newcestown won the championship following a 1-23 to 0-8 defeat of Valley Rovers in the final. This remains their only championship title in the grade.

Mallow's Seán Hayes was the championship's top scorer with 4-36.

Team changes

To Championship

Promoted from the Cork Intermediate Hurling Championship
 Fermoy

From Championship

Promoted to the Cork Senior Hurling Championship
 Ballyhea

Results

Round 1

Round 2

Round 3

Relegation play-off

Round 4

Quarter-finals

Semi-finals

Final

Championship statistics

Scoring events

Widest winning margin: 24 points
Valley Rovers 3-20 – 0-05 Inniscarra (Round 3)
Most goals in a match: 6
Ballinhassig 4-16 – 2-12 Carrigaline (Round 1)
Most points in a match: 48
Mallow 2-26 – 1-22 Inniscarra (Round 1)
Most goals by one team in a match: 4
Ballinhassig 4-16 – 2-12 Carrigaline (Round 1)
Kanturk 4-11 – 1-15 Bandon (Round 2)
Cloyne 4-11 – 0-12 Carrigaline (Round 4)
Mallow 4-16 – 1-12 Watergrasshill (Round 4)
Ballinhassig 4-17 – 1-12 Castlelyons (Quarter-final)
Most goals scored by a losing team: 2
Carrigaline 2-12 – 4-16 Ballinhassig (Round 1)
Cloyne 2-11 – 1-16 Watergrasshill (Round 1)
Cloyne 2-09 – 0-18 Mallow (Quarter-final)
Most points scored by a losing team: 22 
Inniscarra 1-22 – 2-26 Mallow (Round 1)

Top scorers

Top scorer overall

Top scorers in a single game

Miscellaneous

 On 16 May 2015, Seán Hayes from Mallow scored 2-13 against Iniscarra. It remains a record individual score for a player.
 After winning the championship title and gaining promotion, Newcestown become the first club from the Carbery Division to have teams in both the senior hurling championship and senior football championship.

References

External links

 2015 Cork PIHC results 

Cork Premier Intermediate Hurling Championship
Cork Premier Intermediate Hurling Championship